Jelovec pri Makolah ( or , in older sources Jelovci) is a settlement in the Municipality of Makole in northeastern Slovenia. It lies in the valley and surrounding hills of a small right tributary of the Dravinja River. The area is part of the traditional region of Styria. It is now included with the rest of the municipality in the Drava Statistical Region.

References

External links
Jelovec pri Makolah at Geopedia

Populated places in the Municipality of Makole